Capture the Sun may refer to:

 Capture the Sun (Illogic and Blockhead album)
 Capture the Sun (Hollywood Monsters album)
 Capture the Sun, a novel by Jo Ann Algermissen
 Capture the Sun, a novel by Shirl Henke